Rayan Yaslam Mohammed Aboudan Al Jaberi (born 23 November 1994), or simply Rayan Yaslam, is an Emirati professional footballer who plays as a midfielder for Emirati club Al Ain and the United Arab Emirates national team.

International career 
Yaslam made his international debut for the United Arab Emirates on 17 December 2017, in a friendly against Iraq.

References

External links
 
 

1994 births
Living people
People from Al Ain
Emirati footballers
Association football midfielders
Al Ain FC players
UAE Pro League players
United Arab Emirates international footballers